Paulinerkirche may refer to:
Paulinerkirche, Göttingen
Paulinerkirche, Leipzig